The Zambia women's national football team, nicknamed the Copper Queens, represents Zambia in women's association football. There is also a Zambia women's national under-17 football team, a Zambia women's national under-20 football team, and Olympic qualifying team and a Homeless World Cup team. The country has participated in several qualifying tournaments for the FIFA Women's World Cup and other African-based football tournaments. The country is the first landlocked nation in Africa to qualify for a senior World Cup of either men's or women's, having its maiden debut in the 2023 FIFA Women's World Cup.

History

Background
Zambia women's national football team is called the Copper Queens. In 1985, almost no country in Africa had a women's national football team. Women's football was formally organised by the Football Association of Zambia in 1983.  Since that time, Zambia has created a women's senior national team and an under-20 team. Women's football continues to be supported by the national federation who have budgeted money for the women's game and youth game. In 2009, there were 100 women's teams for players over 16, and 112 youth women's teams for players under 16. There is a national women's league established in the country along with regional and school competitions.

Women's football in Africa as a whole faces problems that include limited access to education, poverty amongst women in the wider society, and fundamental inequality present in the society that occasionally allows for female specific human rights abuses. When quality football players are produced in Africa, often they leave the country to seek greater opportunities elsewhere, to the detriment of the local game. Funding also is a problem for the women's game in Africa, with most of the funding for women's football in the Africa coming from FIFA, not the local national football association.

Zambia women's national football team has had their kit sponsored. In 2003, the kit for the national team was provided as a result of a sponsorship deal with Umbro who first agreed to sponsor the Zambia national football team. The team's official kit colours include green shorts, a green jersey and green socks. The team has received media coverage from the Zambia Daily Mail, Times of Zambia and the Post Newspapers.  This coverage has included pictures of players being printed in the newspaper and interviews with players.

Performance
Some of the earliest matches Zambia women's national football team played were in 1994, for qualification for 1995 FIFA Women's World Cup. They played in a 5 November 1994 World Cup qualifier against South Africa in South Africa, where Zambia lost 3–5. In the return match in Lusaka, Zambia on 17 November 1994, Zambia lost again but with a score of 2–6.

Between these games and 2001, the country did not play in any FIFA sanctioned matches. The country participated in the 2002 COSAFA Cup women's tournament in Harare, Zimbabwe. They were in Group A. Zambia beat the Malawi women's national football team 8–0 on 20 April.  Zambia played against Zimbabwe women's national football team on 22 April where they lost 0–4. On 23 April, Zambia beat Lesotho women's national football team 3–1. They finished second in their group.  On 26 April, Zambia lost to South Africa women's national football team 1–3 in the semifinals.  They went on to beat Mozambique women's national football team 1–0 in the third place game, with Julia Siame scoring the only goal in the 60th minute. Later that year, in a regional qualifying match for a different tournament, on 21 September in Lusaka, Zambia against South Africa, the team lost 1–4 after being down 0–2 at the half.  In the return match in South Africa on 12 October 2002, they again lost 0–4. By 2003, the country was ranked the 106th best female women's national team by FIFA.

In 2004, their rank dropped to 113. That year, the team was coached by Cephias Katongo, who was also coaching the Zambia national under-17 football team and a top-level club team at the same time. In 2004, Zimbabwe women's national football team had committed to play a match against Zambia before Zimbabwe took on Tanzania in Dar e Salaam but this did not happen because of organizational problems by Zimbabwe Football Association.

In 2005, the country's FIFA ranking was unchanged and remained 113, with the country playing in no FIFA recognised matches. The following year, in 2006, Zambia women's national football team world ranking dropped down to 126. That year, the head coach was George Chikokola. In March 2006, the team played a home and away set of against Congo DR. On Saturday, 11 March 2006 in a game played in Lubumbashi, Congo DR won 3–0 against Zambia.  Congo DR led 1–0 at the half. On Saturday, 25 March 2006 in a game played in Chingola, Zambia lost 2–3, a score that remained the same from half time, against Congo DR. In 2005, Zambia was supposed to host a regional COSAFA women's football tournament, with ten teams agreeing to send teams including South Africa, Zimbabwe, Mozambique, Malawi, Seychelles, Mauritius, Madagascar, Zambia, Botswana, Namibia, Lesotho and Swaziland. There is no indication this tournament happened.

The 2006 team had 20 players. The regional COSAFA championship team was announced on 18 August 2006.  Three other players were chosen as reserves.  The roster included Goalkeepers: Mwenzi Lungu and Christabel Kabemba, Defenders: Sampa Mutale, Lillian Chalimbana, Florence Tembo, Anna Lungu, Harriet Banda, Charity Mwanza and Ruth Mubanga, Midfielders: Etas Banda, Martha Mutale, Susan Banda and Rixina Lutaka, Strikers: Gift Lisaka, Charity Mpongo, Debora Shamaoma, Mwangala Kamuti, Noria Sosala, Mutimbwa Chizyuka and Sandra Mwamba. The reserves were Loveness Musoni, Leya Bowa and Abba Lungu. The 2006 Confederation of Southern African Football Associations women's tournament was held in Lusaka. They were in Group A. On 22 August, they tied Namibia 2–2 with Noria Sosala scoring in the 15th minute and Charity Mpongo scoring in the 30th minute for Zambia. They beat Swaziland 7–0 on 24 August, with Charity Mpongo scoring in the 23rd, 43rd, 64th and 67th minutes, Susan Banda scoring in the 37th minute, Gift Lishika scoring in the 41st minute, and Martha Kapombo scoring in the 56th minute for Zambia.  They finished in the top of their group.  On 25 August in a semifinal against Namibia, they tied 1–1 with Martha Kapombo scoring their only goal in the 90th minute.  They lost the game in an overtime shoot out by 4–5.  On 26 August, they beat Zimbabwe 2–1 to finish third with Noria Sosala scoring both goals in the 67th and 75th minutes.

2007 saw an improvement in rank for Zambia, moving up nine sports to 117 best team in the world. That year, the team was supported to participate in the 2007 African Games qualifying tournament, opening against the Mozambique women's national football team but Zambia withdrew from the tournament before they played a single game. Later that year, on Sunday, 2 December 2007 in a game played in Harare, Zimbabwe won 3–1 against Zambia.  The game was part of the 2008 African Women Championship. In the return match on Sunday, 16 December 2007 in a game played in Lusaka, Zambia won 2–1 against Zimbabwe.

In 2008, the team's ranking again went up, this time to 110. The played one FIFA recognised match on Sunday, 4 May 2008 in a game played in Benguela against Botswana.  Zambia won 4–2, holding on from a 3–1 score at the half. In 2009, FIFA ranked the country as the 92 in the world. That year, they did not play any FIFA recognised matches. The team's world ranking fell in 2010 to 122. That year, they played in only two FIFA recognised matches. The first was on Saturday, 2 October 2010 in a game played in Lobatse against Botswana, which Zambia won 4–1, holding on to a 3–0 half time lead. The second game was on Saturday, 23 October 2010 in a game played in Lusaka. Zambia won 2–1 against Botswana holding on to a 1–0 half time lead.

Zambia women's national football team's rank fell again in 2011, this time to 125th best in the world. They did not make it into the final group qualification round for the CAF region that fought it out to represent Africa in the World Cup.  In January, the team played a pair of games against South Africa.  They lost the 15 January game in Lusaka 1–2, going down despite a score of 0–0 at the half.  They lost the 29 January game in Umlazi 0–3 after being down 0–1 at the half. Later that year, they played three games in Harare against South Africa, Tanzania and Botswana. On Saturday, 2 July, South Africa won 4–1 against Zambia. On Sunday, 3 July, Zambia won 4–1 against Tanzania. On Tuesday, 5 July, Botswana lost 1–4 against Zambia. The country did not have a team competing at the 2011 All Africa Games.
Going into the 2012 season, the national team coach is Enala Phiri-Simbeye, a woman with Deborah Chisanga serving as the team's skipper. On 14 January 2012, they played a game against Malawi that they won 7–0 after being ahead 4–0 at the half. The game was part of the CAF African Women's Championship and was played in the first round and played in Lusaka. Prior to the start of the game, the team danced on the field and sang Chikokishi music. Players on their roster included Anne Kabanji, Misozi Zulu and Mwila Bowa. Malawi beat Zambia 4–2 following a 1–0 lead at halftime in the return leg played in Blantyre, Malawi on 29 January 2012.  Suzan Banda scored the second goal of the game, and the first for Zambia in the match. Mupopa Kawange scored Zambia's second goal.  Zambia had a number of fans, most women, who attended the game in Malawi. These fans played music during the game to encourage their team's players.  Music played included "Time Time yawo yatha", a Zambian hit song.  Another song played was a "Akamwire", a Malai hit song. In March 2012, the team was ranked the 126th best in the world and the 19th best in CAF.

In the African qualifiers for the 2020 Olympics, they defeated Cameroon in the final round and qualified for the Olympics for the first time. In their Olympics debut, they experienced a 3–10 loss to the Netherlands, the highest-scoring women's football match in Olympics history. Nonetheless, Zambia's participation in the Olympics eventually fed its growth, and in the 2022 Women's Africa Cup of Nations, Zambia successfully reached the semi-finals, beating Senegal on penalties, thus became the first landlocked country in Africa to qualify for a senior FIFA World Cup tournament, with Zambia set to debut in the 2023 FIFA Women's World Cup.

Team image

Nicknames
The Zambia women's national football team has been known or nicknamed as the "Copper Queens".

Other national teams

Olympic/U-23 team
For the 2012 Summer Olympics, there are no age restrictions for players, though Zambia has opted to qualify with a U20/U23 side. Zambia competed in the qualifying tournament in an effort to represent the country at the 2012 Summer Olympics.  The qualification tournament started in 2010.  The team was coached by Enala Phiri-Simbeye. During their campaign, they beat the Botswana women's national football team 4–1 in Gaborone and beat them again 2–1 in Lusaka.  The quality performance of the team earned praise from women's groups inside the country. In January 2011, Zambia had to face South Africa in the qualifying tournament for the Olympics. The squad named to play against South Africa included goalkeepers Mirriam Katamanda, Ennie Matukuta, Defenders Meya Banda, Verocia Chiluba, Jessica Chabota, Mulai Wilombe, Deborah Chisenga, Veronica Chisala, Midfielders Misozi Zulu, Susan Banda, Etas Banda, Fostina Sakala, Kabange Mupopo, Rachel Chisha, Chisala Musonda, and Strikers Mwila Bowa, Noria Sosala, Gift Lisaka and Ednasha Mambwe. Chiluba is the second daughter of Zambia's president.

Coached by Enala Simbeya, Zambia's U23 team participated in the 2011 All-Africa Games qualifiers. They played a pair of games against Zimbabwe. On Sunday, 13 February 2011 in a game played at the Rufaro Stadium in Harare, Zimbabwe won 1–0 against Zambia, overcoming a half time score of 0–0. On the return leg played on Sunday, 27 February 2011 in a game played at Nkoloma Stadium in Lusaka, Zambia lost 1–3 to Zimbabwe, scoring a goal in the second half with the first half ending with Zambia down 0–3. Simbeya did not name her 18-woman team until a day before the game.  The loss eliminated them, with Zimbabwe going on to play Angola.

U-20 and U-17 teams

Zambia women's national under-20 football team has participated in qualification tournaments for several events including the U19/U20 World Cup and the African Women's Championships. The team participated in the first edition of the African Women U-19 Championship held in 2002.

Zambia women's national under-17 football team has competed in several competitions representing their country, including in the qualifying part of the FIFA U-17 World Cup, and the African Women U-17 Championships. The team participated in the 2008, 2010 and 2012 African qualification tournaments for the FIFA U-17 World Cup.

Homeless World Cup team
In 2008, a national team represented the country at the Homeless World Cup. In round robin play, they won every game and were Crowned Champions. The tournament was held in Australia Melbourne.  They beat Paraguay 6–1, Uganda 6–1, Kyrgyzstan 5–4, Liberia 4–1, Cameroon 17–0, Australia 18–1 and Colombia 10–1.  In the half finals, they beat Kyrgyzstan 10–0. In the final, they beat Liberia 7–1.The team that represented Zambia at the Homeless World Cup was led by the Twins Coach and Manager James Chibuye and John Chibuye. The tournament was a five aside tournament and it carried eight players Christine Kabemba, Grace Mwango, Melinda Namafe, Carol Kanyemba, Ednasha Mambwe, Jessica Chabota, Ireen Chanda and Sarah Daka.

Results and fixtures

The following is a list of match results in the last 12 months, as well as any future matches that have been scheduled.

Legend

2022

2023

Global sport

Coaching staff

Current coaching staff

Manager history

  Albert Kachinga (2014–2018)
  Bruce Mwape (2018–)

Players

Current squad
 This is the final  squad was announced on 10 February 2023   for 2023 Turkish Women's Cup  . 
Caps and goals accurate up to and including 18 April 2021.

Recent call ups
The following players have been called up to a Zambia squad in the past 12 months.

Previous squads

Africa Women Cup of Nations
2022 Women's Africa Cup of Nations squads

COSAFA Women's Championship
2020 COSAFA Women's Championship squad
2022 COSAFA Women's Championship squad
Turkish Women's Cup
2023 Turkish Women's Cup squads

Captains

Barbra Banda (2016–)

Records

 Active players in bold, statistics correct as of 2020.

Most capped players

Top goalscorers

Honours

Regional
COSAFA Women's Championship
 Runners-up: 2019

Competitive record

FIFA Women's World Cup

Olympic Games

Africa Women Cup of Nations

African Games

COSAFA Women's Championship

*Draws include knockout matches decided on penalty kicks.

Turkish Women's Cup

All−time record against FIFA recognized nations
The list shown below shows the Djibouti national football team all−time international record against opposing nations.
*As of xxxxxx after match against  xxxx.
Key

Record per opponent
*As ofxxxxx after match against  xxxxx.
Key

The following table shows Djibouti's all-time official international record per opponent:

See also

Sport in Zambia
Football in Zambia
Women's football in Zambia
Zambia women's national football team
Zambia women's national football team results
List of Zambia women's international footballers
Zambia women's national under-20 football team
Zambia women's national under-17 football team
Zambia men's national football team

References

External links
Official website 
FIFA profile, FIFA.com 

 
African women's national association football teams